Placocarpa is a genus of flowering plants belonging to the family Rubiaceae.

Its native range is Mexico.

Species:
 Placocarpa mexicana Hook.f.

References

Rubiaceae
Rubiaceae genera